Asolo is a town and comune in the Veneto Region of northern Italy.  It is known as "The Pearl of the province of Treviso", and also as "The City of a Hundred Horizons" for its mountain settings.

History
The town was originally a settlement of the Veneti, and was mentioned as Acelum in the works of Pliny. Its citizens were inscribed into the Roman tribe Claudia.  It was called Acelum in the acts of a synod held in Marano in 588 or 591, since one of the participants was Agnellus episcopus sanctae Acelinae ecclesiae; the name Asolo was already in use by the time of a synod held in Mantua in 827 (or perhaps 835), at which the participation of Arthemius episcopus Asolensis is noted. In 969, Emperor Otto I assigned the territory of the diocese of Acelum/Asolo to the diocese of Treviso. This action may be related to the destruction caused by the Hungarian raiders who in 899 defeated Berengar I of Italy near the town. However, one of the bishops at a synod at Rome under Pope Leo IX in  1049 was called Ugo of Asolo. No longer a residential bishopric, Acelum is today listed by the Catholic Church as a titular see.

In the early Middle Ages Asolo was a possession of the Ezzelini family. Later, it was the capital, and seat of the court, of the fiefdom of Asolo, which was granted by the Republic of Venice (to which it belonged) to Caterina Cornaro, the former Queen of Cyprus; in 1489 it was granted to her for life, but in 1509 when the League of Cambrai conquered and ransacked Asolo, Caterina fled to exile and died in Venice a year later. Under her reign, the painter Gentile Bellini, the poet Andrea Navagero, and the humanist Cardinal Pietro Bembo were part of the court.

In 1798, the Italian impresario Antonio Locatelli built the Asolo Theatre in the former audience hall of the castle of Caterina Cornaro.

The theatre was later purchased by Florida, for the John and Mable Ringling Museum of Art. The theatre was disassembled, shipped to Sarasota, Florida, and reassembled in one of the museum's galleries in 1952.
It was then decided that the theatre should be reassembled into a usable theatre, on the museum's grounds in the late 1950s. The newly constructed theatre opened in 1958, and is now the home of both the Asolo Repertory Theatre and the Florida State University/Asolo Conservatory for Actor Training.

The town was also home to the English poet Robert Browning, the actress Eleonora Duse, the explorer Freya Stark, the violinist Wilma Neruda and the composer Gian Francesco Malipiero.

Jewish history
The earliest evidence of Jews in Asolo dates back to the middle of the sixteenth century. At that time, 37 Jews were living in Asolo. The community had owned a cemetery, from which two ancient tombstones are presented in the local gallery. On November 22, 1547, 10 Jews belonging to the community of Asolo, consisted at the time of 7 families and 2 guests, were killed by a mob led by a man called Antonio Parisotto. Five Jewish families’ houses were destroyed. A number of the attackers were put to justice and sentenced to death or exile. One of the survivors was Marco Cohen, who founded the Cantarini family, known for several of its members such as Hayyim Moses Cantarini, and others.
Other documentations of the Jewish community of Asolo mentions the prohibition of Jews bearing weapons and obligation to wear the yellow badge. There is evidence to Jewish presence after the 1546 attack, dating from the middle of the 17th century. The Jewish quarter was situated at the turn of Colmarion street, bounded on the north by the old road Colmarion, on the south by Piazza del Pavion and by the last stretch of via s. Caterina and crossed by the short Belvedere alley - this area was called "the Ghetto", housing about six houses.

Frazioni
 Casella
 Pagnano
 Villa d'Asolo

Main sights
Remains of an amphitheatre (in the Villa Freya) and of an aqueduct.
Rocca (castle, late 12th-early 13th centuries).
The Castle of Caterina Cornaro, now home to the Eleonora Duse theatre.

Palazzo della Ragione, housing the city's museum.
The Cathedral, built in 1747. In the interior is the Assunta altarpiece by Lorenzo Lotto.

For a number of years, the Convento di Santo Pietro (situated just below la Rocca) housed an American university: Consortium International for Management and Business Analysis (CIMBA). Students from all over the world lived, studied, and worked in the converted convent in Asolo while earning their MBA. The CIMBA program has since been relocated to a larger campus in nearby Paderno del Grappa.

 Chiesa dell'Assunta (Assumption of Our Lady, who is portrayed in the mosaic of the main façade), the cathedral of the former residential see of Acelum or Asolo.
 Chiesa di San Gottardo (deconsecrated): it now houses music concerts.
 Chiesa di Santa Caterina, with frescos from the 14th century
 Chiesa di Sant'Anna, next to the cemetery where Freya Stark and Eleonora Duse are buried.

References

Bibliography

External links

Asolo Boots & Shoes
CIMBA

Hilltowns in Veneto